State Highway 67 ( RJ SH 67) is a State Highway in Rajasthan state of India that connects Sardarsamand in Pali district of Rajasthan with Desuri in the same district of Rajasthan. The total length of RJ SH 67 is 87 km. 

This highway connects RJ SH 61 in Sardarsamand to RJ SH 62 in Desuri. It also crosses National Highway 14 and National Highway 65 in Pali

Other cities and towns on this highway are: Pali, Ramsiya, Somesar, Nadol, Narlai.

See also
 List of State Highways in Rajasthan
 Roads in Pali district

References
 State Highway

Pali district
State Highways in Rajasthan